Justin Torkildsen (born July 3, 1981 in Boulder, Colorado)  is an American actor, best known for his role as Rick Forrester on the daytime soap opera, The Bold and the Beautiful. He portrayed the role from 1999 to 2006.

Torkildsen received his first nomination in 2000 for his portrayal of Rick at the YoungStar Awards for "Best Young Actor/Performance in a Daytime TV Series". In 2001, he won a Daytime Emmy Award for "Outstanding Younger Actor in a Drama Series", and was consecutively nominated in the same category in 2002. He was also nominated at the Young Artist Awards in 2001 for "Best Performance in a Daytime TV Series - Young Actor". He was also nominated for a Soap Opera Digest Award for "Outstanding Younger Lead Actor" in 2003.

Awards and nominations

References

External links

1981 births
Living people
American male soap opera actors
American people of Norwegian descent
Male actors from Boulder, Colorado
Male actors from Colorado
Daytime Emmy Award winners
Daytime Emmy Award for Outstanding Younger Actor in a Drama Series winners